107 may refer to:
107 (number), the number
AD 107, a year in the 2nd century AD
107 BC, a year in the 2nd century BC
107 (New Jersey bus)

See also
10/7 (disambiguation)
Bohrium, chemical element with atomic number 107